The 2019 ADAC TCR Germany Touring Car Championship will be the fourth season of touring car racing to be run by the German-based sanctioning body ADAC to the TCR regulations. The series will run predominantly in ADAC's home nation Germany. As a support category to the ADAC GT Masters series, the championship will also take in races in the neighbouring nations of Austria, the Netherlands and the Czech Republic. 

On 20 December 2018 it was announced a partnership between the series' promoter and Auto Sport Switzerland, the Swiss National Sporting Authority, which was going see all 7 rounds of the calendar as part of the 2019 TCR Swiss Trophy which was set to be in its second edition. The TCR Swiss Trophy was set be open to Swiss drivers as well as any driver with valid racing license, issued by Auto Sport Switzerland. On 23 April 2019 it was announced by Auto Sport Switzerland that the TCR Swiss Trophy will be postponed until 2020 due to lack of entries. 

Harald Proczyk will be the defending Drivers' champion, while HP Racing International will the defending Teams' champions.

Teams and drivers 
Yokohama is set to become the official tire supplier, taking over from Hankook.

Calendar and results 
The 2018 schedule was announced on 23 September 2018, with three events scheduled to be held outside Germany. The championship will again run in support of the ADAC GT Masters weekends as well as ADAC GT4 Germany and ADAC Formula 4 (with the exception at Autodrom Most).

Drivers' Championship 

Scoring systems

Teams' Championship

Footnotes

References

External links 

 
 

2019 in German motorsport
Germany Touring Car Championship